Tetratheca paucifolia is a species of plant in the quandong family that is endemic to Australia.

Description
The species grows as a leafless or sparsely-leaved, multistemmed shrub to 10–45 cm in height. The pink flowers appear from July to September.

Distribution and habitat
The range of the species lies in the Avon Wheatbelt, Swan Coastal Plain and Geraldton Sandplains IBRA bioregions of south-west Western Australia. The plants grow on sand, clay loam and lateritic soils on slopes and breakaways.

References

paucifolia
Eudicots of Western Australia
Oxalidales of Australia
Taxa named by Joy Thompson
Plants described in 1976